Urbi et Orbi ('to the city [of Rome] and to the world') denotes a papal address and apostolic blessing given by the pope on certain solemn occasions.

Etymology
The term Urbi et Orbi evolved from the consciousness of the ancient Roman Empire. The invocation is expressed by the pope in his capacity as both the bishop of Rome (urbs = city; urbi the corresponding dative form; compare: urban) and the head of the Roman Catholic Church throughout the world (orbis = earth; orbi the corresponding dative form; compare: orbit).

The formula is found more frequently in the language of the Church, as in the inscription at the Lateran Basilica, which is: omnium urbis et orbis Ecclesiarum mater et caput - "the head and mother of all churches of the city and of the earth" = the principal and mother of all churches of the world.

In the 4th century, Pope Damasus I wrote in a letter to the bishops of Illyricum: Unde iustum est, omnes in Universo Romanorum Orbe Doctores legis, ea, quae legis sunt, sapere, et non fidem doctrinis variis maculare. - (English: "Hence, it is just, that all doctors of the law in the Universe of the World of the Romans, those, who are of the law, are wise, and do not teach the faith with various doctrines.")

The ritual of the papal blessing Urbi et Orbi developed in the 13th century during the reign of Pope Gregory X, who consulted Niccolò and Maffeo Polo before his election.

Occasions 

The Urbi et Orbi address and blessing is the most solemn form of blessing in the Catholic Church, and is reserved for the most solemn occasions. These occasions include Easter, Christmas, and the proclamation of a newly elected pope concluding a conclave.

Urbi et orbi blessings are usually given from the central loggia of Saint Peter's Basilica in Rome, at noontime, and are broadcast worldwide through the European Broadcasting Union and other linkups. The address concludes with greetings in many languages in relation to the feast celebrated.

The Roman Catholic Church grants a plenary indulgence by the willful grace and intent of the pope, on the usual conditions, to those who "devoutly receive" the blessing that the pope imparts Urbi et Orbi.

For any ordinary plenary indulgence, the "usual conditions" are:
 Reception of sacramental confession through a Catholic priest within 20 days (before or after) of performing the specific work
 Reception of Eucharistic communion within 20 days (before or after) of performing the specific work 
 Prayers for the intentions of the pope designated for that particular month or occasion, usually at the same time the work is performed, though recitation some days before or after also suffices

Gaining a plenary indulgence requires that a baptized Roman Catholic must also exclude any attachment to sin, even venial sin.

Since 1985, this indulgence is granted not only to the people in Saint Peter's Square, but also to those who though unable to be physically present, "piously follow" it by radio or television.

This is now extended to all who receive the papal blessing over the Internet ("the new communications medium"), since the blessing is preceded by an announcement by a cardinal (usually the cardinal protodeacon): "His Holiness Pope N. grants a plenary indulgence in the form laid down by the Church to all the faithful present and to those who receive his blessing by radio, television and the new communications media. Let us ask Almighty God to grant the Pope many years as leader of the Church and peace and unity to the Church throughout the world."

The only yearly occasions for the Urbi et Orbi blessing are Christmas and Easter. Besides that, another systematic occasion for the Urbi et Orbi comes at the end of a papal conclave when the new pope makes his first appearance to the world following his election. In addition, Popes John Paul II, Benedict XVI, and Francis started with a short speech, with the latter requesting prayers from the faithful, and John Paul II deliberately mispronouncing the word “correct” in Italian in an effort to gain the support of the followers below. The people were nervous about having a non-Italian as pope for the first time since the Dutch born Pope Adrian VI who reigned from January 1522 to September of 1523.

On 27 March 2020, Pope Francis imparted an extraordinary Urbi et Orbi blessing in response to the COVID-19 pandemic. He stood in the door of Saint Peter's Basilica, at the head of Saint Peter's Square (without the presence of the public) following a prayer. For this blessing, the Apostolic Penitentiary loosened the requirements to receive the Eucharist and go to confession, due to the impossibility for people affected by lockdowns and suspension of liturgies. The Salus Populi Romani image and the crucifix from the church of San Marcello al Corso were brought to the square for the occasion. The Pope did not use the formula of the apostolic blessing; instead, he performed a Benediction of the Blessed Sacrament.

Greetings in different languages 

From Pope Paul VI to Pope Benedict XVI, after delivering their Urbi et Orbi message, the pope would greet the different nations in their native languages. The pope typically began by saying: "To those who listen to me, I address a cordial greeting in the different language expressions." Pope Francis has since stopped this practice.

Formulæ of apostolic blessing

Latin 
Sancti Apostoli Petrus et Paulus: de quorum potestate et auctoritate confidimus, ipsi intercedant pro nobis ad Dominum.
℟: Amen.
Precibus et meritis beatae Mariae semper Virginis, beati Michaelis Archangeli, beati Ioannis Baptistae et sanctorum Apostolorum Petri et Pauli et omnium Sanctorum, misereatur vestri omnipotens Deus; et dimissis omnibus peccatis vestris, perducat vos Iesus Christus ad vitam æternam.
℟: Amen.
Indulgentiam, absolutionem, et remissionem omnium peccatorum vestrorum, spatium veræ et fructuosae pœnitentiae, cor semper paenitens, et emendationem vitae, gratiam et consolationem Sancti Spiritus; et finalem perseverantiam in bonis operibus tribuat vobis omnipotens et misericors Dominus.
℟: Amen.
Et benedictio Dei omnipotentis, Patris, et Filii, et Spiritus Sancti, descendat super vos et maneat semper.
℟: Amen.

English translation 
May the Holy Apostles Peter and Paul, in whose power and authority we trust, intercede for us before the Lord.
℟: Amen.
Through the prayers and merits of Blessed Mary ever Virgin, Saint Michael the Archangel, Saint John the Baptist, the holy apostles Peter and Paul, and all the saints, may Almighty God have mercy on you and forgive all your sins, and may Jesus Christ bring you to everlasting life.
℟: Amen.
May the almighty and merciful Lord grant you indulgence, absolution and the remission of all your sins, a season of true and fruitful penance, a well-disposed heart, amendment of life, the grace and comfort of the Holy Spirit and final perseverance in good works.
℟: Amen.
And may the blessing of Almighty God, the Father, and the Son, and the Holy Spirit, come down on you and remain with you forever.
℟: Amen.

Former practice
Prior to the occupation of Rome by the army of the Kingdom of Italy (20 September 1870), this blessing was given more frequently and at specific basilicas at Rome:
 Saint Peter's Basilica—Holy Thursday, Easter, the Feast of Saints Peter and Paul, and at the papal coronation
 Archbasilica of St. John Lateran—Ascension (sometimes this was postponed until Pentecost), and when a new pope was enthroned as Bishop of Rome
 Basilica of Saint Mary Major—Assumption
On the occasion of a Holy Year the pope gave the blessing on other occasions too for the benefit of pilgrims. In the jubilee year of 1650 Pope Innocent XI did so at Epiphany, Pentecost, and All Saints. He and later popes gave such special-occasion blessings from the balcony of the Quirinal Palace, which was then the papal residence.<ref>Andrew Meehan, "Urbi et Orbi" in Catholic Encyclopedia (New York 1912)</ref>

After the occupation, Pope Pius IX considered himself a "prisoner in the Vatican" and in protest ceased to give the blessing. The practice was later resumed, though in a more limited manner, following the resolution of the so-called "Roman Question" (i.e., the legal relationship between the Holy See and the Italian government).

Other uses
It is the motto of Long Island University.

See also

 List of ecclesiastical abbreviations
 List of Latin phrases

References

External links
 Urbi et Orbi article from The Catholic Encyclopedia''
 
 Audio of Pope John Paul I's blessing following his election as Pope
 Pope John Paul II's Urbi et Orbi messages
 Pope Benedict XVI's Urbi et Orbi messages

Holy See
Latin religious words and phrases